The Price of Power is a 1969 Spaghetti Western directed by Tonino Valerii. The film stars Giuliano Gemma as the hero Bill Willer who tries to get revenge against the killers of his father while at the same time trying to prevent an assassination plot against president James Garfield (played by Van Johnson, with José Suárez playing Vice President Chester A. Arthur) in 1881.

Plot
The president ends up dying from an assassin's bullet, but Willer's further quest for revenge is ultimately more successful. Spanish actress Maria Cuadra plays Lucretia Garfield, the President's wife. In her role she portrays pretty much the role of Jackie Kennedy as a glamorous President's wife. Even in the assassination scene, Cuadra seems to emulate many of the same actions from Jackie Kennedy's last moments with John F. Kennedy in Dallas in 1963.

Cast
 Giuliano Gemma as Bill Willer
 Warren Vanders as Arthur MacDonald
 Benito Stefanelli as Sheriff Benny Jefferson
 Fernando Rey as Pinkerton
 Ray Saunders as Jack Donovan
 Michael Harvey as Jeff Wallace 
 Van Johnson as James A. Garfield
 José Suárez as Chester A. Arthur
 Maria Cuadra as Lucretia Garfield
 Antonio Casas as Mr. Willer
 Manuel Zarzo as Nick
 Julio Peña as Governor of Texas
 José Calvo as Dr. Strips

Production
The film's concept was conceived by Massimo Patrizi, Luigi Comencini's brother-in-law, and serves as an adaptation of the story of John F. Kennedy's assassination in the form of a Western. Patrizi also imposed another true story in his script, that the attempted murder of James A. Garfield in 1881.

Although the opening titles of the film credit the story and screenplay only to Patrizi, the film was rewritten by Valerii and Ernesto Gastaldi. Valerii commented that he did not remember Patrizi's script word-for-word, but described it as "extremely basic, whereas Gastaldi and I deepened it. We established the essential themes to develop, introduced the character played by Fernando Rey, the banker who is also the assassination's mandator, and so on." Gastaldi stated that "Patrizi's treatment was simply thrown in the bin, but the producer had signed a contract with him which stated that he was to be credited as the sole author of the script. Since I didn't care about my name in the titles, I had no problem writing the script and not signing it."

Release
The Price of Power was released theatrically in Italy on December 10, 1969, by Cidif. It grossed a total of 1,273,858,000 lire on its domestic release in Italy. It received a release in Spain on June 9, 1970, as La muerte de un presidente.

References

Bibliography

External links

1969 films
Spaghetti Western films
1969 Western (genre) films
Films directed by Tonino Valerii
Films scored by Luis Bacalov
Films about assassinations
Films about presidents of the United States
Cultural depictions of James A. Garfield
Cultural depictions of Chester A. Arthur
Films shot in Almería
Films with screenplays by Ernesto Gastaldi
1960s Italian films